Fight to Survive is the debut album by the American-Danish glam metal band White Lion, released by Victor Records in Japan in 1985. The album charted at number 151 on the Billboard 200.

Background	
The band was signed to Elektra Records, which shelved the album with no intention of publishing it in the USA. Philadelphia-based Grand Slamm Records bought the album from Elektra and released it in America the following year. Tramp has noted that once White Lion was dropped by Elektra Records, their manager managed to get the right to license the album and release it in Japan. The album actually broke in Europe before it did in the USA thanks to magazines covering the band. Tramp is very proud of songs like "All the Fallen Men" and "Kid of 1,000 Faces," which he considers among the darkest songs they have written.
 	
The song "Broken Heart" was released as the band's debut single and featured a music video with drummer Greg D'Angelo and bassist Dave Spitz appearing in the video and it was recorded on stage at L'Amour in Brooklyn.  The track was re-recorded and updated for the band's 1991 release, Mane Attraction, and featured a new music video. "El Salvador" was released as a promo single.

In an interview in the book "Nothin' But a Good Time" with guitarist Vito Bratta, he told that people said that he improved much between "Fight to survive" and "Pride". He explained that they started the recording sessions of the  "Fight to survive" album with the drums and bass. He played the guitar as a backing track to guide the D'Angelo and Spitz, respectively. When they were finished with drums, bass and later vocals the time was out, so they couldn't do anything and have to keep that guitar material. They returned in 1986 to same studio to record Pride. Finished, and back in New York, they choose to erase this because he thinks that is sounds too much like 1983, and much has happened since then.

Track listing
All songs written by Mike Tramp & Vito Bratta, except where noted.

Some earlier remastered versions of the album feature several live bonus tracks. However, these were recorded during the Pride tour by the band's classic lineup, quite some time after this album. Fight To Survive was re-released in 2014 by Rock Candy Records in a special deluxe collector's edition with fully remastered sound shaped from 24 bit digital technology. The package contains a 12-page full color booklet, 3,500 word essay, enhanced artwork, rare photos and a new interview with vocalist Mike Tramp.

Personnel
Mike Tramp – vocals, rhythm guitar
Vito Bratta – lead guitar
Felix Robinson – bass, keyboards
Nicky Capozzi – drums

Additional personnel
James LoMenzo – bass (member at time of album release, listed as band member in album credits)
Greg D'Angelo – drums (member at time of album release, listed as band member in album credits)
 Harry Baierl - piano
 Roderiich Gold - keyboards

Production
 Caroline Greyshock - cover photo

Charts

References

External links
Official White Lion website
Official Mike Tramp website

1985 debut albums
White Lion albums